Maria Ploae (born 19 February 1951) is a Romanian actress. She appeared in more than twenty films since 1973.

Selected filmography

References

External links 

1951 births
Living people
Romanian film actresses
Actresses from Bucharest
20th-century Romanian actresses
21st-century Romanian actresses
Romanian actresses